In molecular biology mir-650 microRNA is a short RNA molecule. MicroRNAs function to regulate the expression levels of other genes by several mechanisms.

Diabetic and Non-Diabetic Heart Failure
miR-650 is one of a group of six miRNAs with altered expression levels in diabetic and non-diabetic heart failure. This altered expression corresponds to various enriched cardiac dysfunctions.

NDRG2 regulation
miR-650 has further been reported to target a homologous DNA region in the promoter region of the NDRG2 gene.  There is direct regulation of this gene at a transcriptional level, leading to repressed NDRG2 expression.

See also 
 MicroRNA

References

Further reading

External links 
 

MicroRNA
MicroRNA precursor families